Ricardo Saúl Monreal Morales (born 10 February 2001) is a Mexican professional footballer who plays as a forward for Liga MX club Necaxa.

References

External links
 

2001 births
Living people
Mexican footballers
Association football forwards
Alebrijes de Oaxaca players
Club Necaxa footballers
Liga MX players
Ascenso MX players
Footballers from Zacatecas
People from Zacatecas City